"The Crying Game" is a song written by Geoff Stephens. It was first released by English rock singer Dave Berry in July 1964. It reached number five on the UK Singles Chart.

The song was covered by Boy George which reached number 15 on the US Billboard Hot 100 and number one in Canada in 1992. Three versions of the song, by Dave Berry, Kate Robbins and Boy George, were used in the film titled after the song The Crying Game directed by Neil Jordan.

Background
The song was written by Geoff Stephens. Stephens thought the main attraction of the song was the title; to him the title "seemed the perfect seed from which to grow a very good pop song." The sentiment of the song inspired the lyrics and the tune, which according to him, arrived in his "head simultaneously". He thought the line "One day soon, I'm going to tell the moon, about the crying game" was particularly effective. The line "I know all there is to know" was inspired by his father, according to Stephens. Stephens recorded a demo with fellow songwriter John Carter at the Southern Music studio in Denmark Street, and gave a copy to Decca producer Mike Smith. Mike Smith liked the song and arranged for Dave Berry to record the song.

The song was included in Dave Berry's self-titled debut album, where session guitarist Big Jim Sullivan played lead guitar on the tracks, and Jimmy Page supported. On "The Crying Game", Sullivan experimented a DeArmond pedal to change the sound of his guitar.

The song became Dave Berry's first top 10 hit, peaking at No. 5 on the British singles chart.

Charts

Boy George version

English singer Boy George covered and released "The Crying Game" in 1992, and both this version and the original Dave Berry recordings were used as the theme to the 1992 Neil Jordan movie The Crying Game. George's version of the song was produced by the Pet Shop Boys and reached number 22 on the UK Singles Chart, number 15 on the US Billboard Hot 100, and number one in Canada and Iceland. It became the biggest solo hit that George achieved in the US or Canada. The songs are heard during the end credits of the movie.

This version was also featured in the Jim Carrey comedy film Ace Ventura: Pet Detective. This was a joke reference to the film The Crying Game, with which it shared a plot point.

Critical reception
Larry Flick from Billboard complimented George's "genius reading" of the song. Dave Sholin from the Gavin Report concluded, "It's been said again and again that all any performer needs is the right material to have a hit. Boy George is just the right singer to resurrect this song". Dennis Hunt from Los Angeles Times wrote, "Those who have seen the movie will understand why Boy George is the perfect choice to sing the moody, Pet Shop Boys-produced title song--easily George’s best vocal since the early Culture Club days." A reviewer from Music & Media felt it has the same "ethereal ambiance" as the one to TV series Twin Peaks, "punctuated by a similar big twanging guitar." 

Alan Jones from Music Week described it as "a strange little ballad, it's been pumped up in commercial house style by George, whose fragrantly fragile vocals never fail to impress." Frank DeCaro from Newsday found that the singer's version of "The Crying Game" is "the most mesmerizing vocal since Annie Lennox first asked "Why" last summer. And, it's produced by (and sounds like) Pet Shop Boys, another fave." He also declared it as a "lush, synth update" of Dave Berry's 1964 Brit Hit. Sam Wood from Philadelphia Inquirer wrote, "The gender-bending karma chameleon teams up with the Pet Shop Boys for a stunning version of the title song that drips with bittersweet languor." Charles Aaron from Spin said, "Heard it in a mall, wanted to weep in my Orange Julius."

Track listings
 UK and European 7-inch
 A. "The Crying Game"
 B. "I Specialise in Loneliness" (edit)

 US 7-inch (red vinyl)
 A. "The Crying Game"
 B. "Stand by Your Man" (by Lyle Lovett)

 European and UK 12-inch and CD single
 1.(A) "The Crying Game"
 2.(B1) "The Crying Game" (extended dance mix)
 3.(B2) "I Specialise in Loneliness" (edit)

 US cassette single
 A. "The Crying Game" (Boy George)
 B. "The Crying Game" (Dave Berry)

Charts

Weekly charts

Year-end charts

Other versions
 Brenda Lee charted the first U.S. version of "The Crying Game."  She reached number 87 in January 1965.
 Ian and the Zodiacs released a charting version in 1964 in the U.S.
 Kylie Minogue covered the song on her Fever Tour in 2002, incorporating it in a medley with several other ballads to rapturous  response.

References

1964 singles
1992 singles
1993 singles
Pet Shop Boys
Songs written for films
RPM Top Singles number-one singles
Number-one singles in Iceland
Songs written by Geoff Stephens
Brenda Lee songs
Boy George songs
Dave Berry (musician) songs
1964 songs
Decca Records singles
Polydor Records singles
SBK Records singles
Song recordings produced by Mike Smith (British record producer)